Mrs. Sen is a 2013 Bengali film directed by Agnidev Chatterjee and produced by Pankaj Agarwal. It features actors Rituparna Sengupta and Rohit Roy in the lead roles. Indradeep Dasgupta composed the music for the film. The film released on 6 June 2013.

Plot 
The film begins with the scenic beauty of the Himalayas, and in the backdrop Anuradha (Rituparna Sengupta) was reading out letters to her never-to-be-born child. Then, a sudden telephone ring breaks the silence of an early December morning. Anuradha received the call and is stupefied upon hearing the voice from the other side of the telephone, which stated that her husband, Somnath (Rohit Roy) had been the victim of a deadly accident in Thailand and was currently in coma stage. Anuradha realised that she has to catch the very next flight as soon as possible and get to her husband, who was admitted to a hospital.

Anuradha and Somnath were married for seven years, and were leading a happy life without any problems. Anuradha, who was desiring to be a mother, was told by her husband that due to some problems, he could not impregnate her. Somnath was able to settle disputes with Anuradha after a long try. Anuradha, who passed from a Bengali Medium school, had never been abroad. She had just received a passport to go to Dubai with her husband, the next January.

As Anuradha reaches Thailand, she comes across the fact that her husband has a wife and a child there. In fact, Somnath's other wife, Sohini (Hrishita Bhatt), was also in the car during the accident. But even before she can think and determine anything, she was given the task of looking after Somnath's 8-year-old boy and Sohini's brother (Subhasish Mukhopadhyay). Anuradha is perplexed as she couldn't decide whether to love or hate the innocent child. Later, when Sohini becomes conscious again, she too comes across the fact behind Anuradha's existence. She didn't want to believe the fact at once, but later, she faces the truth. On the other hand, Anuradha gets into a dilemma about whom to hate- her husband, for cheating her, or Sohini. Sohini is soon released from the hospital, though she was not totally recovered. A peculiar situation prevailed over the Sen family, where Sohini and Anuradha tried their best to make their place in the family. After a few days, the news of Somnath's death in the hospital reaches the two women. The events which occur next after the only connection between the two women was gone, form the climax of the story.

Cast 
 Rituparna Sengupta as Anuradha
 Rohit Roy as Somnath
 Hrishita Bhatt as Sohini
 Priyangshu Chowdhury as Rishabh
 Shankar Chakraborty as Anuradha's brother
 Biplab Chatterjee as Somnath's father
 Anusuya Majumdar as Somnath's mother
 Subhasish Mukhopadhyay as Sohini's brother
 Rupsa Guha as Indian Embassy Employee
 Pulokita Ghosh as Indian Embassy Employee
 Ushasie Chakraborty in a cameo appearance

Soundtrack 

Soundtrack of Mrs. Sen has been composed by Indraadip Dasgupta. Lyrics are penned by Indraadip Dasgupta and Srijato. The track-list includes three Rabindra Sangeets.

Track listing

See also 
 Aparajita Tumi
 Biwi No.1

References

External links 
 

Bengali-language Indian films
2010s Bengali-language films
Films directed by Agnidev Chatterjee
Films scored by Indradeep Dasgupta